This list details Australian musicians, performers, producers and composers that have been successful in winning a Grammy Award. Many on the list have also been inducted into the Australian Recording Industry Association ARIA Hall of Fame.

A Grammy Award (originally called Gramophone Award) – or Grammy – is an accolade by the National Academy of Recording Arts and Sciences of the United States to recognise outstanding achievement in the music industry. The first Grammy Awards ceremony was held on 4 May 1959, and it was set up to honour musical accomplishments by performers for the year 1958.

Australian musicians and performers have produced a wide variety of popular music which has been commercially successful on the international scene. However, success at the Grammy Awards has been quite rare for Australian musicians.  The first Australian to win a Grammy was Joan Sutherland in 1961.  The most successful Australians (all of whom were not born in Australia) are The Bee Gees, Olivia Newton-John and Keith Urban who have won 4 Grammy Awards each.

Categories

Record of the Year 

Record of the Year is awarded to the performer and the production team of a single song.

Album of the Year 

Album of the Year is awarded to the performer and the production team of a full album.

Song of the Year 

Song of the Year is awarded to the composer(s) of the song.

Best New Artist 

Best New Artist is awarded to a promising breakthrough performer who releases, during the Eligibility Year, the first recording that establishes the public identity of that artist (which is not necessarily their first proper release).

Best Pop Duo/Group Performance

Best Pop Performance by a Duo or Group with Vocals

Best Hard Rock Performance

Best Dance Recording

Best Dance/Electronic Recording

Best Dance/Electronic Album

Best Alternative Music album

Best Rap Album

Best R&B Album

Best Male Rock Vocal Performance

Best Female Pop Vocal Performance

Best Female Country Vocal Performance

Best Folk Album

Best Male Country Vocal Performance

Best Classical Vocal Soloist Performance

Best Classical Performance – Vocal Soloist (With or Without Orchestra)

Video of the Year

Best New Age Album

Producer of the Year, Non-Classical

Best Compilation Soundtrack For Visual Media

Best Music Film

Best Rock or Rap Gospel Album

Best Contemporary Christian Music Performance/Song

Best Christian Music Album

Best Chamber Music/Small Ensemble Performance 
In 2013 Best Small Ensemble Performance was renamed to Best Chamber Music/Small Ensemble Performance.

References

External links
Grammy Awards – Past Winners Search
Australian Artists who have won a Grammy Award
Grammy-winning Aussies

Australian
Grammy Award winners